is a city located in Ishikari Subprefecture, Hokkaido, Japan, and home to the New Chitose Airport, the biggest international airport in Hokkaido and closest airport to Sapporo, as well as the neighboring Chitose Air Base. As of May 1, 2017, the city has an estimated population of 96,580, with 48,485 households, and a population density of 155 persons per km2. The total area is 594.95 km2. The city was founded on July 1, 1958. The city is notable for having a Peace Pagoda, built by the Japanese Buddhist order Nipponzan Myohoji in 1978.

History
 1880: The village of Chitose (consisting of a merger of the localities of Chitose, Osatsu, Usakumai, Rankoshi, Izari, Shimamatsu) is established.
 1897: The village of Eniwa (consisting of the localities of Izari and Shimamatsu) (now a city) splits off.
 1915: Chitose (consisting of the localities of Chitose, Osatsu, Usakumai, Rankoshi) becomes a Second Class Municipality.
 1939: Chitose becomes a First Class Municipality.
 1942: Chitose promoted to town status.
 Post WWII - Chitose hosts a US Air Force base.
 July 1, 1958: Chitose promotes to city status.

Geography
Chitose is one of the gateways to the Shikotsu-Toya National Park, Lake Shikotsu and Mount Tarumae. The city is bounded by Eniwa in the north and by Tomakomai in the south.

Origin of the name

In the Ainu language, Chitose was originally called shikot, meaning big depression or hollow, like Lake Shikotsu which is a caldera lake. In Japanese, this sounded too much like , so it was changed to Chitose.

Climate 
Chitose experiences a humid continental climate with cold winters and warm summers.

Economy
China Airlines operates its Sapporo office on the third floor of the airport building.

The airline Hokkaido Air System was at one time headquartered at the New Chitose Airport in Chitose. Now its head office is on the property of Okadama Airport in Higashi-ku, Sapporo.

Transport

Air
 New Chitose Airport

Rail
Muroran Main Line runs through the east of the city but there is no station.
Chitose Line : Bibi - Minami-Chitose - Chitose - Osatsu
Chitose Line (branch line) : Minami-Chitose - New Chitose Airport
Sekishō Line : Minami-Chitose

Road
Chitose is accessed by two expressways with an interchange in the west and another in the north on a separate expressway and the Chitose-Eniwa Junction connecting with the Eastern Hokkaido Expressway in the northwest. Chitose is also linked by National Route 36, National Route 274, National Route 276, National Route 337, and National Route 453.

Education
Chitose has a university, two high schools, 18 junior high schools, and 10 elementary schools.

Universities
 Chitose Institute of Science and Technology
 Hokkaido Chitose College of Rehabilitation

High schools
 Hokkaido Chitose High School
 Hokkaido Chitose Hokuyou High School

Mascots 

They are a fusion of eggs and airplanes to represent the city's dependence on eggs.

Twinnings
Chitose has sister city relationships with:
 Anchorage, Alaska, United States (since 1968)
 Ibusuki, Kagoshima, Japan (since 1994)
 Kongsberg, Norway (since 1988)
 Changchun, Jilin, China (since 2004)

Notable people
Chiyotaikai Ryūji, sumo wrestler
Aina Suzuki, voice actress

References

External links 

Official Website 

 
Cities in Hokkaido